Judith Frieda Lina Herzberg (born 4 November 1934) is a Dutch poet and writer.

Life and work
Judith Herzberg is the daughter of lawyer and writer Abel Herzberg. During World War II Herzberg went into hiding on various locations. Since 1983 Herzberg lives alternately in the Netherlands and Israel. She mainly writes poems and plays, and also works on films. Herzberg debuted in 1961 as a poet in the weekly Vrij Nederland. Two years later, she published her first poetry collection, Zeepost. She also wrote the plays Leedvermaak, Charlotte and Rijgdraad, which were made into films by Frans Weisz. Charlotte is about the painter Charlotte Salomon who was murdered in Auschwitz. In 1997 Herzberg received the P. C. Hooft Award for her entire oeuvre.

Awards
 1980 Bavarian Film Awards, Best Screenplay
 1981 Jan Campert Prize for Botshol
 1988 Charlotte Köhler-prijs voor Literatuur for Leedvermaak
 1988 Cestoda-prijs
 1989 Nederlands-Vlaamse Toneelschrijfprijs for Kras
 1994 Constantijn Huygens Prize
 1997 P. C. Hooft Award

Works

 1963 – Zeepost (poetry)
 1968 – Beemdgras (poetry)
 1970 – Vliegen (poetry)
 1971 – Strijklicht (poetry)
 1971 – 27 liefdesliedjes (poetry)
 1974 – Dat het 's ochtends ochtend wordt. De deur stond open. Twee dramastukken (drama)
 1977 – Het maken van gedichten en het praten daarover (essay)
 1980 – Botshol (poetry)
 1981 – Charlotte. diary bij een film (diary)
 1982 – Leedvermaak (drama)
 1983 – De val van Icarus (poetry) Deels eerder verschenen in Botshol
 1984 – Dagrest (poetry)
 1984 – Twintig gedichten (poetry)
 1985 – En/of (drama)
 1986 – Merg (drama)
 1986 – De kleine zeemeermin (drama)
 1987 – Zoals (poetry)
 1988 – Tussen Amsterdam en Tel Aviv (articles and letters)
 1988 – De Caracal. Een monoloog (drama)
 1989 – Kras (drama)
 1991 – Een goed hoofd (drama)
 1991 – Teksten voor drama en film. 1972–1988
 1992 – Zoals (poetry) Bevat onder meer de 12 gedichten uit Zoals uit 1987
 1994 – Doen en laten. Een keuze uit de gedichten (poetry)
 1995 – Rijgdraad (drama)
 1996 – Brief aan wie niet hier is. Tussen Jeruzalem en Amsterdam (reisverslag)
 1996 – Wat zij wilde schilderen (poetry)
 1997 – De Nietsfabriek (drama)
 1998 – Een golem (play)
 1998 – Landschap (poems)
 1999 – Bijvangst (poems)
 2000 – Lieve Arthur (drama)
 2004 – Soms vaak (poetry)
 2004 – Thuisreis (drama)

References

External links
Judith Herzberg at Poetry International
Judith Herzberg at Digital Library for Dutch Literature (in Dutch)

1934 births
Living people
Dutch Jews
20th-century Dutch dramatists and playwrights
Dutch women poets
Writers from Amsterdam
Constantijn Huygens Prize winners
P. C. Hooft Award winners
Dutch women dramatists and playwrights
Dutch women screenwriters
20th-century Dutch poets
20th-century Dutch women writers
21st-century Dutch dramatists and playwrights
21st-century Dutch poets
21st-century Dutch women writers